Don Hogan Charles (September 9, 1938 – December 15, 2017) was an American photographer. He was the first African-American staff photographer hired by The New York Times. In his four decades there, Charles photographed notable subjects including Coretta Scott King, John Lennon, Malcolm X and Muhammad Ali.

Life and work 
Charles was born "Daniel James Charles" in New York City on September 9, 1938, to James Charles and Elizabeth Ann Hogan. He attended George Washington High School in Manhattan and went on to study engineering at City College of New York before dropping out to pursue photography.

In 1964, after leaving City College, Charles joined The New York Times and remained there for 43 years, until he retired in 2007.

Before joining The Times he worked as a freelance photographer.  Charles's freelance work appeared in major international publications such as Der Spiegel and Paris Match. His commercial clients included Bill Blass, Oscar de la Renta and Pan American World Airways.

Charles' work is in the collections of MOMA and the National Museum of African American History and Culture.

Among the iconic photos taken by Charles was one of human rights activist Malcolm X holding an M1 carbine while peering out a window. The photo, which Charles took for Ebony, became emblematic of the determination of Malcolm X to protect his family "by any means necessary".

Notable photographs 
 USA, New York City, 1964 – Photograph of Malcolm X looking out of the window of his Queens home.

References

External links

1938 births
2017 deaths
20th-century African-American artists
20th-century American photographers
African-American photographers
American photojournalists
George Washington Educational Campus alumni
Malcolm X
Photographers from New York City
The New York Times visual journalists